Gisele Yashar is a fictional character portrayed by Gal Gadot who appears in the Fast & Furious franchise. Introduced in the film Fast & Furious (2009), she helps Dominic Toretto and later his team in Fast Five (2011), where she forms a romantic relationship with Han Lue. The character is killed in Fast & Furious 6 (2013). Gisele was Gadot's first major film role, and American director Justin Lin hired her due to her past military experience. Gadot performed her own stunts while shooting the films.

Media outlets characterized Gisele through her sexuality. Reactions to the character were mixed: some critics praised the representation of Gisele's sexuality and her relationship with Han while others felt her character was either unrealistic or represented a part of the franchise's poor treatment of women. Gadot's performance received positive feedback, and several commentators requested she reprise the role in a future film.

Appearances
In Fast & Furious (2009), Gisele Yashar (Gal Gadot) is introduced as a liaison for drug trafficker Arturo Braga (John Ortiz). She develops romantic feelings for Dominic Toretto (Vin Diesel), but he rejects her advances. She advises him about the dangers involved in smuggling heroin across the Mexico–United States border to complete a deal with Braga. The drug exchange results in an ambush instigated by Braga, with Toretto protecting Gisele. She helps Toretto by providing him with the location of Braga's hideout in Mexico.

Gisele becomes part of Toretto's team as a weapons expert in the 2011 film Fast Five. She is later revealed to be an ex-Mossad agent. She helps the team with a heist, during which she works closely with Han Lue (Sung Kang), and the two develop a romantic relationship. Following the completion of the mission, Gisele and Han are last shown speeding down the Autobahn, with Gisele sitting in his lap in a Lexus LFA.

At the start of Fast & Furious 6 (2013), Gisele and Han are living together in Hong Kong. Toretto recruits the couple to prevent a heist planned by Owen Shaw (Luke Evans), which could potentially kill millions of people. For the mission Gisele draws on her Mossad experience with interrogation, weapons, and retrieval. While attempting to stop a plane, she is left hanging from the back of a Range Rover. Han attempts to rescue her, but Adolfson (Benjamin Davies), a member of Shaw's gang, uses the opportunity to try and kill him. Gisele lets go of Han's hand to shoot Adolfson, and she falls to her death. Han later kills Adolfson in revenge for Gisele's death. At the end of the film, Roman Pearce (Tyrese Gibson) says a blessing in Gisele's honor during grace.

In the 2015 film Furious 7, a photo of Gisele is shown in Han's personal belongings, and it is later placed in his coffin as part of his memorial service. A deleted scene revealed Gisele had found Letty Ortiz (Michelle Rodriguez) after she was nearly killed by Fenix Calderon (Laz Alonso) and took her to the hospital. Letty asked Gisele why she saved her, and Gisele responded: "Maybe you are the one saving me."

The 2021 film F9 reveals that Gisele had worked with the team's 'future' government contact 'Mr Nobody' (Kurt Russell) during his time running drug operations for the CIA in South America. After her death, Nobody tracked down Han in Tokyo to ask for his help with a vital mission, reasoning that Gisele's faith in Han was enough for Nobody to be assured that Han could be trusted in turn.

Development

Gisele Yashar was Gal Gadot's first major film role, and the actress felt that it had a major impact on her career. She said that her unsuccessful experiences when trying out for Bond girl Camille Montes in the 22nd James Bond film Quantum of Solace (2008) had led to other auditions, specifically the one for Gisele. Gadot was cast by American director Justin Lin. The actress said that her background in the military helped with the audition, explaining: "I think the main reason was that Justin really liked that I was in the Israeli military, and he wanted to use my knowledge of weapons." In 2017, Gadot also thanked Vin Diesel for his input over her selection for the role. Vanity Fair's Yohana Desta identified Gisele as "a breakthrough part that gave Gadot some mainstream recognition".

When discussing her initial response to The Fast and The Furious franchise, Gadot said: "We don't do those kind of movies [in Israel], with those kind of standards". She performed her own stunts during the films, saying: "The adrenaline was just incredible and I enjoyed being able to do the stuff that in real life you can't." Gadot explained that she wanted to feel like a "tough girl" while shooting her scenes. For the character's return in Fast & Furious 6, Gadot told Lin that she wanted Gisele to "be more of a badass", and was given more stunt work for the film. Some of the stunts involved jumping from a moving motorcycle onto a Jeep, being suspended in a harness, and riding a Ducati Monster motorcycle. Media outlets also characterized Gisele through her sexuality; Fuse's Bianca Gracie referred to her as "sensual and intimidating", and The Stranger's Erik Henriksen called her a "villainous seductress".

Critical reception

Gisele Yashar has received a mixed response from film critics. Decider's Meghan O'Keefe praised Gisele as a new type of female character for The Fast and The Furious franchise, writing that she provided a more "sophisticated, and unapologetically femme vibe" when compared to the rougher Ortiz. O'Keefe responded positively to Gisele's use of her sexuality and femininity as a tactic to manipulate men, as well as to her romance and partnership with Han. Nerdist News's Sydney Bucksbaum also identified the character's relationship with Han as a highlight, writing that they became "one of the most iconic couples from all the movies". Some commentators had a more negative response to the character. The A.V. Club's Tom Breihan felt that Gisele's transformation from "a drug lord's envoy to a former Mossad agent and a badass killer" was part of how the franchise gave "implausible makeovers" to certain characters. IndieWire's Kate Erbland included Gisele's death as an example of the franchise's poor treatment of women; she explained that female characters, such as Gisele, "primarily exist to round out the storylines of the films' male characters, often as love interests" and are rarely brought into focus as individuals.

Gadot's performance received positive feedback from critics. In a 2017 article, Heavy.com's Brendan Marrow listed Gisele as one of Gadot's best performances prior to her starring role as Wonder Woman in the 2017 film of the same name. O’Keefe of Decider described Gadot and her character as the "secret weapon" of The Fast and The Furious franchise, praising the actress for her "totally kickass contribution to the bonkers, high-octane, super-charged [films]". O'Keefe described Gadot's performance as "balanc[ing] unbridled badassery with unabashedly feminine charm". Joe Reid, also writing for Decider, recommended that Gisele should be revived for future installments of the franchise, but questioned if the producers could afford to have Gadot return for another film. Bucksbaum campaigned for the character's return, and wrote that she could likely be featured in a future film through a flashback sequence.

Notes

References

Fast & Furious characters
Fictional Israeli Jews
Fictional drug dealers
Fictional Mossad agents
Film characters introduced in 2009
Female film villains